Vaymand (also Romanized as Vāymand; also known as Wemānd) is a village in Bazarjan Rural District, in the Central District of Tafresh County, Markazi Province, Iran. As of the 2006 census, its population was 85, with there being 28 families.

References 

Populated places in Tafresh County